Acalyptris arenosus is a moth of the family Nepticulidae. It was described by Mark I. Falkovitsh in 1986. It is found in Turkmenistan and Uzbekistan.

References

Nepticulidae
Moths of Asia
Moths described in 1986